I clowns (also known as The Clowns) is a 1970 mockumentary film by Federico Fellini about the human fascination with clowns and circuses.

Plot summary

Cast

Main
 Riccardo Billi as himself – Italian Clown (credited as Billi)
 Federico Fellini as himself
 Gigi Reder as himself – Italian Clown (credited as Reder)
 Tino Scotti as himself – Italian Clown (credited as Scotti)
 Valentini as himself – Italian Clown
 Fanfulla as himself – Italian Clown
 Merli as himself – Italian Clown
 Carlo Rizzo as himself – Italian Clown (credited as Rizzo)
 Colombaioni as Themselves – Italian Clowns (credited as I 4 Colombaioni)
 Pistoni as himself – Italian Clown
 Martana as Themselves – Italian Clowns (credited as I Martana)
 Giacomo Furia as himself – Italian Clown (credited as Furia)
 Alvaro Vitali as himself (The Troupe)
 Dante Maggio as himself – Italian Clown (credited as Maggio)
 Galliano Sbarra as himself – Italian Clown (credited as Sbarra)
 Peppino Janigro as himself – Italian Clown (credited as Janigro)
 Carini as himself – Italian Clown
 Maunsell as himself – Italian Clown
 Nino Terzo as himself – Italian Clown (credited as Terzo)
 Osiride Pevarello as Clown (Credited as Peverello)
 Nino Vingelli as himself – Italian Clown (credited as Vingelli)
 Alberto Sorrentino as himself – Italian Clown (credited as Sorrentino)
 Fumagalli as himself – Italian Clown
 Valdemaro as himself – Italian Clown
 Luigi Zerbinati as himself – Italian Clown (credited as Zerbinati)
 Ettore Bevilacqua as himself – Italian Clown (credited as Bevilacqua)
 Maya Morin as Maya (La troupe)
 Anna Lina Alberti as herself – Alvaro's mother (La troupe) (credited as Lina Alberti)
 Gasparin as Gasparino (La troupe)
 Alex as himself – French Clown
 Georges Loriot as himself – French Clown (credited as Père Loriot)
 Maïs as himself – French Clown
 Bario as himself – French Clown
 Ludo as himself – French Clown
 Nino as himself – French Clown
 Charlie Rivel as himself
 Pierre Étaix as himself
 Annie Fratellini as herself
 Victor Fratellini as himself
 Jean-Baptiste Thiérrée as himself (credited as Baptiste)
 Tristan Remy as himself
 Liana Orfei as herself
 Rinaldo Orfei as himself
 Nando Orfei as himself
 Franco Migliorini as himself – Animal Tamer
 Anita Ekberg as herself

Cameo/Uncredited
 Maria Grazia Buccella as herself
 Aristide Caporale as Railwayman
 Victoria Chaplin as herself
 Liliana Chiari as herself
 Dante Cleri as Fascist
 Shirley Corrigan as Audience member
 Feverello as himself – Italian Clown
 Gustavo Fratellini as himself – Italian Clown
 Adelina Poerio as Dwarf nun

Production
The film was made for the Italian TV station RAI with an agreement that it would be released simultaneously as a cinema feature. RAI and co-producer Leone Film compromised on its release, with RAI broadcasting it on Christmas Day, 1970, and Leone Film releasing it theatrically in Italy the following day, December 26, 1970.

It is a docufiction: part reality, part fantasy. The film has sometimes been referred to as one of the first mockumentaries in film history (Woody Allen's Take the Money and Run having been released in just the previous year). Being documentary and fiction in one, The Clowns distinguishes itself by being a mockumentary with unique characteristics, not the least of which is reflecting Fellini's own increasing fascination with how documentary films reflect "reality". Fellini had already explored this semi-fictional documentary genre in 1969's Fellini: A Director's Notebook and would further do so in 1987's Intervista, both of which contain unreliable depictions of Fellini himself making the film within the film narrative.

Reception
The film has a 100% approval rating on Rotten Tomatoes, based on 18 reviews with an average rating of 6.9/10. Film Critic Roger Ebert gave the film three stars out of four.

References

External links
 
 
 
 The Clowns at Rotten Tomatoes

Docufiction films
1970 films
1970s fantasy comedy films
Films directed by Federico Fellini
1970s Italian-language films
Films about clowns
Films with screenplays by Federico Fellini
Films scored by Nino Rota
Italian fantasy comedy films
1970 comedy films
1970s Italian films